Micium Mhone (born 19 January 1992) is a Malawian footballer who plays as an attacking midfielder for Blue Eagles and the Malawi national team. He was included in Malawi's squad for the 2021 Africa Cup of Nations.

References

External links

1992 births
Living people
Malawian footballers
Malawi international footballers
Association football midfielders
Blue Eagles FC players
Jomo Cosmos F.C. players
South African Premier Division players
National First Division players
Malawian expatriate footballers
Expatriate soccer players in South Africa
Malawian expatriate sportspeople in South Africa
2021 Africa Cup of Nations players